Daniel Edward Gray (born 23 November 1989) is an English semi-professional footballer who plays for Alfreton Town. Gray began his career as a central midfielder, before being converted into a right back, where he has spent most of his first-team career.

Career
Born in Mansfield, Nottinghamshire, Gray made his debut for Chesterfield in October 2008, having earlier spent a work experience placement at non-league Alfreton Town in March 2008.

On 31 December 2010, it was announced that Gray would sign a one-month loan contract with Macclesfield Town, effective from 1 January 2011.

Gray made his debut for the club on 1 January 2011, scoring in a 2–2 draw against Bury.

Gray re-joined Macclesfield on loan in November 2011.

He was released by Chesterfield at the end of the 2011–12 season.

Gray signed for Lincoln City on 24 July 2012 after a successful trial period at the club.

He joined Conference Premier team Alfreton Town on a one-year contract on 15 July 2014.

On 9 January 2015, he completed a loan move to Bradford Park Avenue.

Career statistics

References

1989 births
Living people
Footballers from Mansfield
English footballers
Chesterfield F.C. players
Alfreton Town F.C. players
Macclesfield Town F.C. players
Lincoln City F.C. players
Bradford (Park Avenue) A.F.C. players
English Football League players
National League (English football) players
Association football midfielders
Association football fullbacks